Jeremy K. B. Kinsman (born January 28, 1942) is a Canadian former career diplomat. He was the Canadian High Commissioner to the United Kingdom (2000–2002) and the Canadian Ambassador to the European Union (2002–2006).

Life and career
Born in Montreal, Quebec, Kinsman graduated from Princeton University in 1963 and the Institut d'études politiques de Paris in 1965. He joined the Department of External Affairs in 1966. During his career, he was the Canadian ambassador to the Russian Federation, Azerbaijan, Georgia, Kazakhstan, Kyrgyzstan, Belarus, Armenia, Tajikistan, Turkmenistan, Uzbekistan, Italy, Albania, and the European Union. He was also the Canadian High Commissioner to the United Kingdom and Malta. He resigned in 2006.

In 2007, he was named Diplomat-in-Residence at the Woodrow Wilson School of Princeton University. The School partnered in the democracy support project Kinsman headed under the Community of Democracies that researched, and produced a field guide for democracy support, "A Diplomat's Handbook for Democracy Development Support", now in a Third Edition, published by CIGI (Centre for International Governance Innovation) in 2013. In 2009–2010 Kinsman was appointed Regents' Lecturer at the University of California, Berkeley and joined Berkeley's Institute of Governmental Studies as Resident International Scholar. From 2011-2017, he was concurrently Distinguished Diplomatic Visitor at Ryerson University, Toronto. He has been a member of the Foreign Affairs Council of Justin Trudeau.

Kinsman is a regular contributor to print media and TV, notably as lead foreign affairs writer for Policy Magazine. He is a Distinguished Fellow of the Canadian International Council, and since 2007 has been an independent Director on the Board of Dundee Precious Metals, Inc.. Kinsman is also a member of the Prague Society for International Cooperation.

Kinsman lives in British Columbia.

References

 Diplomat postings from the Department of Foreign Affairs and International Trade
 Diplomatic Appointments

External links
 Jeremy Kinsman's contributions on cbc.ca
 Jeremy Kinsman's contributions on OpenCanada.org
 

1942 births
Living people
Sciences Po alumni
People from Montreal
Princeton University alumni
Ambassadors of Canada to the European Union
Ambassadors of Canada to Russia
Ambassadors of Canada to Azerbaijan
Ambassadors of Canada to Georgia (country)
Ambassadors of Canada to Kazakhstan
Ambassadors of Canada to Kyrgyzstan
Ambassadors of Canada to Belarus
Ambassadors of Canada to Armenia
Ambassadors of Canada to Tajikistan
Ambassadors of Canada to Turkmenistan
Ambassadors of Canada to Uzbekistan
Ambassadors of Canada to Italy
Ambassadors of Canada to Albania
High Commissioners of Canada to Malta
High Commissioners of Canada to the United Kingdom